Shoko, Shōko or Shōkō may refer to:

Shoko (Buddhist) (1162–1238), disciple of Hōnen and second patriarch of Jōdo-shū
Emperor Shōkō (1401–1428), the 101st Emperor of Japan
Shōko (instrument), a small gong used in the gagaku music of Japan
Shōko (given name), a feminine Japanese given name
Kotsuzumi, a small drum used in Japanese music
8306 Shoko, a main-belt asteroid
Shoko B'Sakit, an Israeli chocolate milk sold in plastic bags
A nickname for chocolate in Hebrew, and other languages